Baraghani (meaning from the village of Baraghan or related to it) is an Iranian surname. Notable people with the surname include:
 Mohammad Taqi Baraghani.
 Muhammad Salih Baraghani.
 Fatima Baraghani, better known as Táhirih and Qurratu l-`Ayn, an influential poet and theologian of the Bábí Faith in Iran.

Iranian-language surnames